Iraq War Scandal may refer to several events connected to the Iraq War:

 Iraq War misappropriations
 Habbush letter